About half of the Camas National Wildlife Refuge in southeastern Idaho consists of lakes, ponds, and marshlands; the remainder is grass sagebrush uplands, meadows, and farm fields. Camas Creek flows through the length of the refuge.

Mammal species that inhabit this refuge are coyote, pronghorn, moose, elk, porcupine, white-tailed deer, cottontail rabbit, muskrat, and weasel.

Water management is a critical component of Camas Refuge operations. An extensive system of canals, dikes, wells, ponds, and water-control structures is used to manipulate water for the benefit of wildlife, with an emphasis on nesting waterfowl. Haying and prescribed fire are used to manipulate vegetation in some fields, and small grain crops are grown to provide supplemental feed for geese and cranes and to keep them from damaging private croplands.

Geography

Bird habitat
During migration, which peaks in March–April and October, up to 50,000 ducks and 3,000 geese may be present on the refuge. Tundra and trumpeter swans visit in the hundreds during migration. Short-eared owls and long-billed curlews are commonly seen in this refuge. It has become a popular swan watching destination with hundreds of tundra and trumpeter swans stopping over during migration. Several state record songbird observations have been made in refuge cottonwood groves on the refuge.

References
 Profile of Camas National Wildlife Refuge
 Refuge website

National Wildlife Refuges in Idaho
Protected areas of Jefferson County, Idaho
Wetlands of Idaho
Landforms of Jefferson County, Idaho
Protected areas established in 1937
1937 establishments in Idaho